Peepin' in My Window is the fourth studio album of Houston rapper Lil' Keke. It was released on July 17, 2001. Guest appearances include Mr. 3-2, Fat Pat, Big Pokey, Archie Lee, Big Hawk, Al-D and more. There is also a screwed & chopped version available.

Track listing

Lil' Keke albums
2001 albums